Boston University Academy (BUA) is a private high school operated by Boston University.  Founded in 1993 and located on the Boston University campus, the academy is geared toward college preparatory work.  As part of its integration with the university, students are able to take college courses for credit their junior and senior years, and are guaranteed acceptance to Boston University upon maintaining a 3.0 grade point average in Boston University courses.

BUA's student body is drawn from 55 communities: 52% come from public schools, 39% from independent schools, 7% from parochial schools and 2% are from home-school or international schools; 57% are students of color and 47% of students come from multilingual households (representing 26 languages). BUA provides need-based tuition assistance to approximately 31% of the students as of the 2019–2020 academic year.

Accreditation
The academy is accredited by the New England Association of Schools and Colleges and is a member of both the Secondary School Admission Test Board and the Association of Independent Schools of New England.

History
Boston University Academy was proposed and founded in 1993 by Peter Schweich, then the vice president of Boston University, and authorized by John Silber, then the president of Boston University. Peter Schweich was its first headmaster, and served in that role until 1999, when he was succeeded by interim head of school Dr. Jennifer Bond Hickman. Dr. James Tracy replaced Hickman and served until the spring of 2006, when he was replaced by Dr. James Berkman. On August 21, 2014, Berkman announced that he would retire after the 2014–2015 academic year. On November 14, 2014, Provost Jean Morrison announced the appointment of Dr. Ari Betof to replace Berkman effective July 1, 2015. In July 2018, Boston University announced the removal of Dr. Betof following an allegation of sexual misconduct involving a Boston University undergraduate student. Following his departure, Dr. Rosemary White was appointed interim head of school. Dr. White served as interim head of school until Christos J. Kolovos began his tenure in the summer of 2020.

When Boston University Academy was founded, it covered grades 9–12; an 8th grade of approximately 20 students was added in 1999. The 8th grade was dropped in 2005.

On October 26, 2021, teacher Jennifer Formichelli was struck by a bus and killed.

Notable faculty
 Philip Gambone, a published author, primarily taught freshman English during his 13-year tenure from 2004 until his retirement in 2017. Gambone returned for the 2018–2019 academic year after which time he again retired.
 Brett Abigaña, a noted composer and co-founder and associate director of the Boston Composers' Coalition.

References

External links
 
 Boston University Academy Computer Science Club Official Website

Academy, Boston University
Educational institutions established in 1993
High schools in Boston
Gifted education
Private high schools in Massachusetts
1993 establishments in Massachusetts